The 2011 Billboard Music Awards were held May 22, 2011 at the MGM Grand Garden Arena in Las Vegas, Nevada and hosted by Ken Jeong. The awards recognized the most popular artists and albums from 2010.

Performances

Winners and nominees
Winners are listed in bold.

Artists with multiple wins and nominations

Critical reception and controversy
Overall, critics praised the performances in whole. Critics, however, noted Beyoncé as the standout performer of the night. However, some controversy was generated from the show. The Parents Television Council criticized Rihanna and Britney Spears' performance of "S&M", calling it "explicit", with PTC president saying "I cannot imagine what would possibly lead the ABC television network to air a profanity-laced, S&M sex show on primetime broadcast television", while criticizing the choice to air the performance first, on what they claim is a normally family targeted time slot (the show aired at 8:00 p.m.).

References

External links

2011
Billboard awards
2011 in American music
2011 in Nevada
2011 music awards
MGM Grand Garden Arena